José Abraham Alpuche De León  (born 25 November 1987) is a Mexican footballer who plays as a midfielder for Deportivo Chiantla.

References

External links

Abraham to Armenia
Abraham to Deportivo Carchá
Abraham back to Murciélagos

1987 births
Living people
Mexican footballers
Association football midfielders
Ballenas Galeana Morelos footballers
Albinegros de Orizaba footballers
Inter Playa del Carmen players
Murciélagos FC footballers
Ulisses FC players
FC Gandzasar Kapan players
Ascenso MX players
Liga Premier de México players
Mexican expatriate footballers
Expatriate footballers in Armenia
Mexican expatriate sportspeople in Armenia
Expatriate footballers in Guatemala
Mexican expatriate sportspeople in Guatemala
Footballers from Veracruz
People from Minatitlán, Veracruz